The Jefferson Memorial is a presidential memorial built in Washington, D.C. between 1939 and 1943 in honor of Thomas Jefferson, the principal author of the United States Declaration of Independence, a central intellectual force behind the American Revolution, founder of the Democratic-Republican Party, and the nation's third president. 

The memorial features multiple quotes from Jefferson intended to capture his ideology and philosophy, known as Jeffersonian democracy, which was staunchly supportive of American republicanism, individual rights, religious freedom, states' rights, virtue and prioritized and valued what he saw as the undervalued independent yeoman. Jefferson was simultaneously deeply skeptical of cities and financiers and hostile to aristocracy, elitism, and corruption. He is widely considered among the most influential political minds of his age and one of the most consequential intellectual forces behind the American Revolution.  

The Jefferson Memorial is built in neoclassical style and is situated in West Potomac Park on the shore of the Potomac River. It was designed by John Russell Pope, a New York City architect, and built by Philadelphia contractor John McShain. Construction on it began in 1939 and was completed in 1943, though the bronze statue of Jefferson was not completed and added until four years after its dedication and opening, in 1947. Pope made references to the Roman Pantheon, whose designer was Apollodorus of Damascus, and to Jefferson's own design for the rotunda at the University of Virginia as inspirations for the memorial's aesthetics. 

The Jefferson Memorial and the White House form anchor points to the National Mall in Washington, D.C. The Washington Monument, initially intended to be built at the intersection of the White House and the Jefferson Memorial's site, was ultimately built further east because the ground at that location was deemed too soft and swampy.

The Jefferson Memorial is a designated national memorial and is managed by the National Park Service of the U.S. Department of the Interior's National Mall and Memorial Parks division. In 1966, the Jefferson Memorial was named to the National Register of Historic Places. In 2007, it ranked fourth on the "list of America's favorite architecture", published by the American Institute of Architects.

History

Early considerations
The site ultimately selected for the Jefferson Memorial's construction was appealing at least partly because it was located directly south of, and in view of, the White House. By 1901, the Senate Park Commission, known as the McMillan Plan, proposed building a Pantheon-like structure on the site that would host "the statues of the illustrious men of the nation, or whether the memory of some individual shall be honored by a monument of the first rank may be left to the future," but no action was taken by Congress on the commission's recommendation.

The completion of the Tidal Basin Inlet Bridge in 1908 helped facilitate and expand recreational usage of East and West Potomac Parks. In 1918, large liquid chlorine dispensers were installed under the bridge to treat the water, which made the Tidal Basin, also known as Twining Lake, suitable for swimming. The Tidal Basin Beach, on the site of the future Jefferson Memorial, opened in May 1918, operating as a "Whites Only" facility until 1925, when it was permanently closed to avoid addressing the question of whether or not it should be racially integrated. The same year, however, a design competition was held for a memorial to Theodore Roosevelt. The winning design, submitted by John Russell Pope, consisted of a half-circle memorial situated next to a circular basin. Like the McMillan Plan in 1901, however, the plan was never funded by Congress or acted upon.

Funding and authorization
Another opportunity for the Memorial's development emerged in 1934 when then President Franklin Roosevelt, who admired Jefferson (in large part because of a book on Jefferson by his friend Claude G. Bowers) inquired with the Commission of Fine Arts about erecting a memorial to Jefferson. Roosevelt included plans for the Jefferson Memorial in the Federal Triangle project, which was then under construction. Later the same year, Congressman John J. Boyland followed Roosevelt's lead, urging Congress to create the Thomas Jefferson Memorial Commission to explore the memorial's development. Boylan was appointed the Commission's first chairman, and Congress eventually appropriated $3 million for the Jefferson Memorial.

The following year, in 1935, the Commission chose John Russell Pope as architect for the Jefferson Memorial. Pope had served previously as architect for the National Archives Building and the original West Building of the National Gallery of Art. He prepared four different plans for the project, each on a different site. One was on the Anacostia River at the end of East Capitol Street; one at Lincoln Park; one on the south side of the National Mall across from the National Archives administration building; and one was situated on the Tidal Basin, directly south of the White House. The Commission preferred the site on the Tidal Basin mainly because it was the most prominent site of those proposed and completed the four-point plan called for by the McMillan Commission, which encompassed the region including the Lincoln Memorial to the Capitol and from the White House to the Tidal Basin site. Pope designed a large pantheon-like structure designed to be situated on a square platform, flanked by two smaller, rectangular, colonnaded buildings.

Construction

Construction on the Jefferson Memorial began December 15, 1938. The cornerstone was laid roughly eleven months later, on November 15, 1939, by Roosevelt himself. By this point, Pope had died in 1937 and his surviving partners, Daniel P. Higgins and Otto R. Eggers, assumed leadership for the Jefferson Memorial's construction. At the request of the Commission of Fine Arts, a slightly more conservative design for the memorial was agreed upon. The memorial's cost was approximately $3 million.

Construction commenced amid some opposition. The Commission of Fine Arts never actually approved any design for the memorial and even published a pamphlet in 1939 opposing both the proposed design and site for the memorial. Additionally, some Washingtonians opposed the proposed location for it because it did not align with L'Enfant's original plan for the city, and many established elm and cherry trees, including rare stock donated by Japan in 1912, would be removed under the memorial's original plan. Construction continued amid the opposition, which included women protestors chaining themselves to cherry trees around the construction site. Opposition to the memorial proved dismaying to Roosevelt, but the opposition diminished notably once revised plans identified a means for maintaining the surrounding cherry trees amidst the memorial's construction.

In 1939, the Memorial Commission hosted a competition to select a sculptor for the planned Jefferson statue to be placed in the center of the memorial. They received 101 entries and chose six finalists. Of the six, Rudulph Evans was chosen as the main sculptor, and Adolph A. Weinman was chosen to sculpt the pediment relief situated above the memorial's entrance.

Landscape architect Frederick Law Olmsted Jr. designed the memorial landscape, which featured a simple design within a circular driveway including primarily Evergreen trees with limited flowering trees or shrubs. The design was perceived as too thin, so white pines and some other plantings were later added before the memorial's dedication in 1943. In the 1970s, nearly three decades after the memorial's opening, additional changes to Olmsted's landscaping were implemented. But in 1993 and 2000, attempts to restore the integrity of Olmsted's initial design were made. Roosevelt ordered trees be cut so that the Jefferson Memorial was clearly visible from the White House; additional tree pruning was also completed to create an unobstructed view between the Jefferson Memorial and Lincoln Memorial.

On April 13, 1943, the 200th anniversary of Jefferson's birthday, the Jefferson Memorial was officially dedicated and opened by Roosevelt. At the time, Evans' statue had not yet been finished due to material shortages that emerged during World War II. Instead, the memorial opened with a temporary plaster cast statue similar to the bronze statue that Evans ultimately completed four years later, in 1947. The statue's cast was developed by Roman Bronze Works in New York City.

On October 15, 1966, in recognition of the Jefferson Memorial's historical and artistic significance, the Jefferson Memorial was named to the National Register of Historic Places.

Description and features

Exterior

The Jefferson Memorial is composed of circular marble steps, a portico, a circular colonnade of Ionic order columns, and a shallow dome. The building is open to the elements.

The memorial is constructed with white Imperial Danby marble taken from Vermont, which rests on a series of granite and marble-stepped terraces. A flight of granite and marble stairs and platforms, flanked by granite buttresses, leads up to the memorial from the Tidal Basin to a portico with a triangular pediment.

The pediment features a sculpture by Adolph Alexander Weinman depicting the Committee of Five, the five members of the committee charged with drafting the U.S. Declaration of Independence. In addition to Jefferson, who was the primary author, committee members included John Adams, Benjamin Franklin, Robert R. Livingston, and Roger Sherman. A cornice with an egg and dart molding surrounds this pediment, and below that is a plain frieze.

Interior

The statue was added four years after the dedication. Among many Jefferson quotes inside the memorial, one of the most prominently situated are those inscribed in the frieze below the dome: "I have sworn upon the altar of God eternal hostility against every form of tyranny over the mind of man." This sentence is taken from a letter written by Jefferson on September 23, 1800, to Dr. Benjamin Rush in which Jefferson defends the constitutional refusal to recognize a state religion.

On the panel of the southwest interior wall are excerpts from the Declaration of Independence:

We hold these truths to be self-evident: that all men are created equal, that they are endowed by their Creator with certain inalienable rights, among these are life, liberty, and the pursuit of happiness, that to secure these rights governments are instituted among men. We...solemnly publish and declare, that these colonies are and of right ought to be free and independent states...And for the support of this declaration, with a firm reliance on the protection of divine providence, we mutually pledge our lives, our fortunes, and our sacred honor.

The inscription uses the word "inalienable", as appears in Jefferson's draft rather than "unalienable" as ultimately appeared in the final Declaration.

On the panel of the northwest interior wall is a quote from the 1777 Virginia Statute for Religious Freedom, which excludes the quote's final sentence and is taken from an August 28, 1789, letter Jefferson wrote to James Madison:

Almighty God hath created the mind free...All attempts to influence it by temporal punishments or burthens...are a departure from the plan of the Holy Author of our religion...No man shall be compelled to frequent or support any religious worship or ministry or shall otherwise suffer on account of his religious opinions or belief, but all men shall be free to profess and by argument to maintain, their opinions in matters of religion. I know but one code of morality for men whether acting singly or collectively.

The Jefferson quotes from the panel on the northeast interior wall come from multiple sources. The first, which begins "God who gave us life gave us liberty" is from A Summary View of the Rights of British America. The second, third, and fourth sentences are from Notes on the State of Virginia. The fifth quote, which begins "Nothing is more certainly written in the book of fate than that these people are to be free" is from Jefferson's autobiography. The sixth sentence, beginning "Establish the law...", is from a letter of August 13, 1786, to George Wythe. The final sentence is from a letter of January 4, 1786, to George Washington:

God who gave us life gave us liberty. Can the liberties of a nation be secure when we have removed a conviction that these liberties are the gift of God? Indeed I tremble for my country when I reflect that God is just, that his justice cannot sleep forever. Commerce between master and slave is despotism. Nothing is more certainly written in the book of fate than these people are to be free. Establish the law for educating the common people. This it is the business of the state to effect and on a general plan.

The inscription on the panel of the southeast interior wall is excerpted from Jefferson's July 12, 1816, letter to Samuel Kercheval:

I am not an advocate for frequent changes in laws and constitutions. But laws and institutions must go hand in hand with the progress of the human mind. As that becomes more developed, more enlightened, as new discoveries are made, new truths discovered and manners and opinions change, with the change of circumstances, institutions must advance also to keep pace with the times. We might as well require a man to wear still the coat which fitted him when a boy as civilized society to remain ever under the regimen of their barbarous ancestors.

A lower level of the structure contains a gift shop and a museum focusing on Jefferson's life and political career.

Location

The monument is located in West Potomac Park in Washington, D.C. on the shore of the Potomac River's Tidal Basin. The park is enhanced with the massed planting of Japanese cherry blossom trees, which pre-dated the memorial's construction and were a 1912 gift from the people of Japan.

Although the Jefferson Memorial is geographically removed from other buildings and monuments in Washington, D.C., the National Mall, and Washington Metro, the memorial plays host to many events and ceremonies each year, including memorial exercises, the Easter Sunrise Service, and the annual National Cherry Blossom Festival and ranks highly among destinations for visitors to the city each year.

Gallery

See also

Monticello
Adams Memorial (proposed)
Benjamin Franklin National Memorial
George Mason Memorial
Washington Monument
Memorial to the 56 Signers of the Declaration of Independence
Architecture of Washington, D.C.
List of national memorials of the United States
List of statues of Thomas Jefferson
List of sculptures of presidents of the United States
Presidential memorials in the United States

References

Bibliography
 Bedford, Steven McLeod, John Russell Pope: Architect of Empire, Rizzoli International Publications, Inc., New York, NY 1998
 Goode, James M. The Outdoor Sculpture of Washington D.C., Smithsonian Institution Press, Washington D.C. 1974
 The National Parks: Index 2001–2003. Washington: U.S. Department of the Interior.

External links

Trust for the National Mall: Thomas Jefferson Memorial
 Official NPS website: Thomas Jefferson Memorial
 "Nothing is more certainly written in the book of fate..."  in its original context
 Three-dimensional rendering of Jefferson Memorial  (without plugin; in English, Spanish, German)
Jefferson Memorial History and Fun Facts

1943 establishments in Washington, D.C.
1947 sculptures
Artworks in the collection of the National Park Service
Bronze sculptures in Washington, D.C.
Buildings and structures completed in 1943
Domes
Jeffersonian democracy
John Russell Pope buildings
Monuments and memorials on the National Register of Historic Places in Washington, D.C.
Monuments and memorials to Thomas Jefferson
National Mall and Memorial Parks
National Memorials of the United States
National Park Service areas in Washington, D.C.
Neoclassical architecture in Washington, D.C.
Southwest (Washington, D.C.)
Statues of Thomas Jefferson
United States Declaration of Independence in art
Works by Adolph Weinman